The 1913 Five Nations Championship was the fourth series of the rugby union Five Nations Championship following the inclusion of France into the Home Nations Championship. Including the previous Home Nations Championships, this was the thirty-first series of the annual northern hemisphere rugby union championship. Ten matches were played between 1 January and 24 March. It was contested by England, France, Ireland, Scotland and Wales.

England won the Grand Slam for the first time, and the Triple Crown for the fourth time. They conceded only one score during the tournament, a dropped goal scored by Ireland, and as of 2020 this remains a record for a Grand Slam-winning team.

Table

Results

References

External links

Six Nations Championship seasons
Five Nations
Five Nations
Five Nations
Five Nations
Five Nations
Five Nations
Five Nations Championship
Five Nations Championship
Five Nations Championship